Mokronoge may refer to the following places in Bosnia and Herzegovina :

 Mokronoge, Tomislavgrad
 Mokronoge, Drvar

See also 

 Mokronoge massacre
 Mokronog